Chí Tài or Nguyễn Chí Tài (August 15, 1958 – December 9, 2020) was a Vietnamese comedian, musician, and singer. Initially starting as a composer and singer in the 1990s, he later became famous for his comedy performances alongside his co-star Hoài Linh.

Biography
From 1976 to 1977, Chí Tài participated in the founding of the Lướt Sóng band. He played as a guitarist during the "Ca khúc chính trị" (Political Song) movement of the Youth Union in Phú Nhuận District, Ho Chi Minh City.

In 1981, Chí Tài migrated to the United States. He intended to start a new life in the US by studying English and computers, as well as taking a break from artistic activities. However, he retained his passion for arts despite his family's objections. Later, Chí Tài enrolled in a piano and a jazz class near his house. His father agreed to spend a pension to buy him an electronic sound system, including drums and musical instruments, so that he could form a young music group. He then formed the family band "Chi Tai's Brothers". During the early days of its establishment, Chi Tai's Brothers was welcomed to perform at weddings and community events.

The band has performed continuously for Thúy Nga center since Paris By Night 18 (Chí Tài himself collaborated with Thúy Nga since Paris By Night 15 as a harmony musician).

Chí Tài later opened a studio to record the performances of Vietnamese overseas singers, ghost stories by Nguyễn Ngọc Ngạn, etc. The soundtracks in the comedies of Paris By Night were all composed by Chí Tài himself. His music's fun, youthful and catchy harmonies made Chí Tài one of the leading Vietnamese remix musicians overseas at that time.

In 1997, Chí Tài had the opportunity to perform with Hoài Linh due to a shortage of actors.

In 2000, Chí Tài switched to working as a comedian. He regularly appeared in various shows of Paris By Night – alongside , Trang Thanh Lan, Kiều Linh, Uyên Chi, Kiều Oanh, Lê Tín, Hoài Linh, Thúy Nga, Hoài Tâm, Việt Hương, Hương Thủy, Bé Tí…

Liveshow

Liveshow Chí Tài – Những Chuyện Tình Nghiệt Ngã 1 (2017) 
 Chuyện tình 1 (Chí Tài, Trường Giang, Hứa Minh Đạt, Lâm Vỹ Dạ, Thanh Tân, Tố My, Tóc Tiên);
 Chuyện tình 2 (Chí Tài, Trấn Thành, Tiến Luật, Thu Trang, Quách Ngọc Tuyên, Hoài Lâm);
 Chuyện tình 3 (Chí Tài, Hoài Linh, Trường Giang, Cát Phượng, Long Đẹp Trai, Nam Thư, Hồng Thanh).

Liveshow Chí Tài – Những Chuyện Tình Nghiệt Ngã 2 (2019) 
 Part 1: Cô Bé Áo Dài – Written by: Chí Tài – Performed by: Chí Tài, Thúy Ngân and Vũ Đoàn NK;
 Part 2: Chuyện Tình 1 (Chí Tài, Hoài Linh, Trường Giang, Lâm Vỹ Dạ, Quách Ngọc Tuyên, Thúy Ngân, Lê Khâm);
 Part 3: Chuyện Tình 2 (Chí Tài, Hoài Linh, Trấn Thành, Lê Giang, Tiến Luật, Khả Như, HH Trần Ngọc Châu);
 Part 4: Ca khúc Yêu – Written by: Nhật Trường – Performed by: Chí Tài, Phương Loan and Vũ Đoàn NK.

Plays 

 Người nhà quê
 Cổ tích một tình yêu
 Dâu đất khách
 Osin là ông nội
 Tuyển vợ (Môi Tím)
 Bên cầu dệt lụa (Liveshow Ái Xuân)
 Quái xế (Liveshow Chí Tài Comedian 2008)
 Dân chơi hàng mướn (Liveshow Chí Tài Comedian 2008)
 Ai Câm (Liveshow Chí Tài Comedian 2008)
 Đánh Ghen (Liveshow Hoài Linh Ru Lại Câu Hò)
 Đèo Gió Hú (Liveshow Hoài Linh Bí Mật Bật Mí Bị Mất)
 Bầy vịt cái (Liveshow Hoài Linh Những Tên Cướp Biển Vùng Caribê)
 Rượu (Liveshow Hoài Linh Kung-Fu)
 Nỗi đau đất dày (Liveshow Hoài Linh Kỳ Án)
 Đêm kinh hoàng (Liveshow Thúy Nga Xin Lỗi, Em Chỉ Là Con Quỷ)
 Cuộc thi các đệ nhất (Hài tết 2010 VCD Chuyện đời)
 Tân Ngao Sò Ốc Hến (Liveshow Bảo Quốc 50 năm vui cười cùng sân khấu)

Gameshow/Talkshow 
Ơn giời cậu đây rồi! – VTV3 (2014–2015)
Bí mật đêm Chủ Nhật – HTV7 (2015)
Tôi là người chiến thắng – HTV7 (2015)
Người bí ẩn (2015, 2019)
Gương mặt thân quen (2017)
Ký ức vui vẻ – VTV3 (2019)
Giọng ải giọng ai – HTV7 (2019)

Personal life
In 1987, Chí Tài married singer Phương Loan. The couple agreed not to have children – so that he would be able to focus on his career. During an interview in 2019, he said that he couldn't help but feel disappointed and regretful because he didn't have a child to follow in his footsteps.

Death 
On December 9, 2020, at Phú Nhuận, Ho Chi Minh City, Chí Tài died in hospital from a stroke. He was discovered lying motionless on the stairs of the 7th floor with his phone at the Botanic apartment building. Although an ambulance was immediately dispatched to take him to the emergency hospital, in the end Chí Tài did not survive and died at 13:35 the same day. Previously, Chí Tài was known to have a history of diabetes.

Phương Loan – Chí Tài's wife – wanted to bring her husband back to the US for burial. Hoài Linh – Chí Tài's colleague and close friend, who had stayed with him in the last minutes – was authorized by his family to take care of this. Visitation was held at the Ministry of Defense Funeral Home No. 5 Pham Ngu Lao Street, Ward 3, Go Vap District, Ho Chi Minh City on December 12 – in accordance with Catholic rites. A large number of Vietnamese artists and thousands of fans were present. The same afternoon, the coffin was brought to Tân Sơn Nhất airport to be brought back to the US according to the family's wishes.

References

1958 births
2020 deaths
20th-century Vietnamese male singers
21st-century Vietnamese male singers
Vietnamese male film actors
Vietnamese male television actors
20th-century Vietnamese male actors
21st-century Vietnamese male actors
Vietnamese musicians
Vietnamese comedy
People from Ho Chi Minh City
Vietnamese Roman Catholics
Vietnamese emigrants to the United States